Kırıkkale Province is a province of Turkey. It is located on the crossroads of major highways east of Ankara leading east to the Black Sea region.  With its rapid population growth it has become an industrial center. The provincial capital is Kırıkkale.

Kırıkkale is a rapidly growing town in central Turkey, on the Ankara-Kayseri railway near the Kızılırmak River. Formerly a village, it owes its rapid rise in population mainly to the establishment of steel mills in the 1950s. These works, among the largest in the country, specialize in high-quality alloy steel and machinery. In the 1960s chemical plants were added.

Districts 

Kırıkkale province is divided into 9 districts (capital district in bold):

 Bahşılı
 Balışeyh
 Çelebi
 Delice
 Karakeçili
 Keskin
 Kırıkkale
 Sulakyurt
 Yahşihan

Gallery

See also
List of populated places in Kırıkkale Province

References

External links

  Kırıkkale governor's official website
  Kırıkkale municipality's official website
  Kırıkkale weather forecast information